Citizens Telecommunications Company of the White Mountains is a Frontier operating company providing local telephone services to portions of Arizona.

The company was formed by Citizens Communications following the acquisition of former Contel/GTE lines in Arizona in 1999. It is separate from Navajo Communications Company, which provides telephone service to customers formerly serviced by Alltel, and Frontier Communications of the Southwest, which provides telephone service to former Verizon California customers.

Telecommunications companies established in 1999
Communications in Arizona
Frontier Communications
1999 establishments in Arizona